Tysson Poots (born January 12, 1988) is an American football wide receiver who is currently a free agent. He was signed by the Dallas Cowboys as an undrafted free agent.

Early years
Poots played high school football at Coronado High School in Henderson, Nevada. He was a two-time All-Statewide receiver. He finished his career with a total 2,014 receiving yards, 270 tackles, 19 sacks and 8 interceptions.

Poots also lettered in basketball & nominee of McDonald's All-American.

College career
Poots had a career total of 43 touchdowns and 3,970 yards. He was named as a Great West Conference all conference receiver in three of his four seasons with the Thunderbirds. He was a Walter Payton camp nominee.

Professional career

Dallas Cowboys
Poots went undrafted in the 2011 NFL Draft, but was signed by the Dallas Cowboys as an undrafted free agent on August 1, 2011. Poots was released during final cuts.

Utah Blaze
Poots was assigned to the Utah Blaze of the Arena Football League on September 30, 2011.

Virginia Destroyers
Poots spent time with the Virginia Destroyers of the United Football League in 2012.

Arizona Rattlers
Poots was assigned to the Arizona Rattlers in 2013, helping the Rattlers advance to ArenaBowl XXVI against the Philadelphia Soul. Poots had a 14-yard touchdown reception in the ArenaBowl.

Las Vegas Outlaws
On February 19, 2015, Poots was assigned to the Las Vegas Outlaws.

References

External links
Tyson Poots at Twitter

1988 births
Living people
American football wide receivers
Southern Utah Thunderbirds football players
People from the Las Vegas Valley
Players of American football from Nevada
Dallas Cowboys players
Utah Blaze players
Arizona Rattlers players
Las Vegas Outlaws (arena football) players